Professor Jean-Marc Jézéquel is a French computer scientist.

Professionally, Jean-Marc Jézéquel worked as a computer scientist at the University of Rennes 1, France. His research contributions have laid the foundations of the theory of Model-driven architecture.
From January 2012 to December 2020, he was Director of IRISA and then Vice President of Informatics Europe.

Education and academic career
Jean-Marc Jézéquel received an engineering degree from Telecom Bretagne in 1986 and a PhD from the University of Rennes 1 in Rennes in 1989. 
He then worked for the Transpac (network) company on an Intelligent Network project. In 1991, he became  a researcher (Chargé de recherche) at the CNRS (Centre National de la Recherche Scientifique). During most of 1996, he has been an invited researcher in Pr. Yonezawa's lab, in the University of Tokyo, Japan.

Since October 2000, he has been Professor of Software Engineering at University of Rennes 1, where he pursued research on the foundations of Model Driven Engineering. From 2000 to 2012 he headed an Inria research team called Triskell.

From January 2012 to December 2020, he was Director of IRISA, a 800 people public research lab in informatics.

From January 2021 he is Vice President of Informatics Europe.

In 2016 he received the Silver Medal from CNRS.

In 2020, he received the Career Award from the IEEE/ACM Model Driven Engineering Languages and Systems conference, which recognizes his long-standing scientific contributions to the MDE community and his exemplary activity for the younger members of the MODELS community.

From January 2022 to April 2022, he was a visiting professor at McGill University.

Publications 
Books, a selection
 Engineering Modeling Languages: Turning Domain Knowledge into Tools, CRC Press, 2016.
 Ingénierie Dirigée par les Modèles : des concepts à la pratique, Éditions Ellipses, 2012 
 Design Patterns and Contracts, Addison-Wesley, 1999
 Object Oriented Software Engineering with Eiffel, Addison-Wesley, 1996

Articles, a selection:
 Design by contract: The lessons of Ariane, with Bertrand Meyer, 1997
 Making components contract aware, Computer 32 (7), 1999
 Refactoring UML models, UML 2001
 Weaving executability into object-oriented meta-languages, MODELS 2005
 Automatic test generation: A use case driven approach IEEE Trans on Software Engineering, 2006
 Models at runtime to support dynamic adaptation, Computer 42 (10), 2009

Notes and references

External links
 JM Jézéquel's web page

Living people
French computer scientists
1964 births